Bartlett is a city in Bell and Williamson counties in the U.S. state of Texas. The population was 1,633 at the 2020 census.

Bartlett lies in two counties as well as two metropolitan areas. The Bell County portion of the city is part of the Killeen–Temple–Fort Hood Metropolitan Statistical Area, while the Williamson County portion is part of the Austin–Round Rock Metropolitan Statistical Area. Known for its late nineteenth and early twentieth century architecture, Bartlett was the site for the filming of movies including The Stars Fell on Henrietta and The Newton Boys, as well as the NBC television drama Revolution.

History
Starting in 1909, Bartlett was the headquarters of the Bartlett-Florence Railway, later the Bartlett Western Railroad, which ran from Bartlett's connection with the Missouri-Kansas-Texas Railroad to the cotton processing center of Florence, Texas.    However, that line was abandoned in 1935.

In 1914 and 1915, Bartlett was home to minor league baseball. The Bartlett Bearcats played as members of the Class D level Middle Texas League for two seasons. Baseball Hall of Fame member Ross Youngs played for Bartlett in 1915.

Geography
The city straddles the line between Bell and Williamson counties; the center of the city is mostly in Bell County, but the slight majority of the city's area is in Williamson County.

Climate
The climate in this area is characterized by hot, humid summers and generally mild to cool winters.  According to the Köppen Climate Classification system, Bartlett has a humid subtropical climate, abbreviated "Cfa" on climate maps.

Demographics

As of the 2020 United States census, there were 1,633 people, 460 households, and 303 families residing in the city.

At the 2000 census, there were 1,675 people, 571 households and 404 families residing in the city. The population density was 1,373.3 per square mile (530.1/km2). There were 638 housing units at an average density of 523.1 per square mile (201.9/km2). The racial makeup of the city was 61.61% White, 17.97% African American, 0.66% Native American, 0.06% Asian, 16.84% from other races, and 2.87% from two or more races. Hispanic or Latino of any race were 33.07% of the population.

There were 571 households, of which 35.0% had children under the age of 18 living with them, 52.0% were married couples living together, 14.5% had a female householder with no husband present, and 29.1% were non-families. 27.3% of all households were made up of individuals, and 16.5% had someone living alone who was 65 years of age or older. The average household size was 2.78 and the average family size was 3.40.

Age distribution was 29.3% under the age of 18, 8.8% from 18 to 24, 23.0% from 25 to 44, 19.9% from 45 to 64, and 18.9% who were 65 years of age or older. The median age was 36 years. For every 100 females, there were 91.2 males. For every 100 females age 18 and over, there were 83.9 males.

The median household income was $26,094, and the median family income was $35,595. Males had a median income of $22,273 versus $21,016 for females. The per capita income for the city was $12,649. About 21.1% of families and 25.6% of the population were below the poverty line, including 29.5% of those under age 18 and 30.3% of those age 65 or over.

Education
Bartlett is served by the Bartlett Independent School District and is home to the Bartlett High School Bulldogs and Lassies.

Culture 

The town of Bartlett is a former boomtown, and is often referred to as a Ghost town, often due to its low population and small economic size.

Notable people 

 Henry Ray Clark (1936–2006), artist
 Louise Holland Coe, first woman elected to the New Mexico Senate, first woman to run for U.S. Congress, 1894–1985
 John C. Holland, Los Angeles City Council member, 1943–1967

References

External links

 Bartlett Area Chamber of Commerce
 

Cities in Bell County, Texas
Cities in Williamson County, Texas
Greater Austin
Killeen–Temple–Fort Hood metropolitan area
Cities in Texas